Moschoneura is a genus of butterflies in the family Pieridae. It contains only one species, Moschoneura pinthous, the pinthous mimic white, which is found in northern South America.

Adults mimic Scada karschina and other Ithomiini butterfly species.

Subspecies
The following subspecies are recognised:
M. p. pinthous (Suriname)
M. p. methymna (Godart, 1819) (Brazil)
M. p. cyra (Doubleday, 1844) (Brazil: Bahia)
M. p. ela (Hewitson, 1877) (Ecuador)
M. p. ithomia (Hewitson, 1867) (Ecuador, Peru)
M. p. amelina (Hopffer, 1874) (Peru)
M. p. proxima (Röber, 1924) (Brazil: Amazonas)
M. p. patricia Lamas, 2004 (Peru)
M. p. monica Lamas, 2004 (Peru)

Gallery

References

External links
Images representing Moschoneura pinthous at Consortium for the Barcode of Life

Butterflies described in 1758
Taxa named by Carl Linnaeus
Dismorphiinae
Pieridae of South America
Monotypic butterfly genera
Taxa named by Arthur Gardiner Butler
Pieridae genera